The year 1525 in science and technology included many events, some of which are listed here.

Events
 Albrecht Dürer's book on geometry and perspective, The Painter's Manual (more literally, the Instructions on Measurement) is published at Nuremberg. It is the first book for adults to be published on mathematics in German.
 First publication of Galen's Of the method of curing diseases in the original Greek, by the Aldine Press in Venice.
 First publication of the collected works of Hippocrates translated into Latin, in Rome.
 Christoff Rudolff's  introduces the modern radical symbol (for square root), √  (without the vinculum above the radicand).
 Publication of Richard Banckes' Herball, the first true herbal printed in Britain.
 First woodcut map of France, produced by Oronce Finé.
 approx. date – Paracelsus discovers the analgesic properties of diethyl ether.

Births
 September 25 – Steven Borough, English explorer (died 1584)
 December 1 – Tadeáš Hájek, Czech physician and astronomer (died 1600)
 approx. date – Hans Staden, German adventurer (d. c.1579)
 Tomás de Mercado, Spanish economist and theologian (died 1575)

Deaths
 approx. date – Henricus Grammateus, Swiss mathematician (born c. 1492)

References

 
16th century in science
1520s in science